Hochheim may refer to:

Places
Germany
 Hochheim am Main, a town in Hesse, Germany
 Hochheim, Thuringia, a municipality in Thuringia, Germany 
United States
 Hochheim, Texas
 Hochheim, Wisconsin

People
Eckhart von Hochheim (c. 1260 - c. 1327, German theologian, philosopher and mystic, commonly known as Meister Eckhart

See also
Höchheim, a municipality in the district of Rhön-Grabfeld in Bavaria